The YO postcode area, also known as the York postcode area, is a group of 29 postcode districts in Yorkshire, England, within ten post towns. These cover most of Central and Eastern North Yorkshire (including York, Scarborough, Pickering, Selby, Thirsk, Malton, Filey and Whitby) and the northern part of the East Riding of Yorkshire (including Bridlington and Driffield). The rest of North Yorkshire is split between the TS, DL, LA, BD, HG, DN and WF postcode areas.



Coverage
The approximate coverage of the postcode districts:

|-
!YO1
| YORK
| City Centre
| City of York Council 
|-
!YO7
| THIRSK
| Dalton, Hambleton, Thirsk, Topcliffe
| North Yorkshire County Council
|-
!YO8
| SELBY
| Barlby, Brayton, Bubwith, Cawood, Camblesforth, Drax, Selby, Thorpe Willoughby
| North Yorkshire County Council
|-
!YO10
| YORK
| Fishergate, Fulford, Heslington, Osbaldwick, Tang Hall
| City of York Council
|-
!YO11
| SCARBOROUGH
| Cayton, Eastfield
| North Yorkshire County Council
|-
!YO12
| SCARBOROUGH
| Seamer
| North Yorkshire County Council
|-
!YO13
| SCARBOROUGH
| 
| North Yorkshire County Council
|-
!YO14
| FILEY
| 
| North Yorkshire County Council
|-
!YO15
| BRIDLINGTON
| Bridlington, Bempton, Buckton, Carnaby, Flamborough, Fraisthorpe, Sewerby, Wilsthorpe
| East Riding of Yorkshire
|-
!YO16
| BRIDLINGTON
| Bridlington, Bempton, Bessingby, Boynton, Buckton, Carnaby, Grindale, Sewerby
| East Riding of Yorkshire
|-
!YO17
| MALTON
| Norton
| North Yorkshire County Council
|-
!YO18
| PICKERING
| Pickering, Thornton-le-Dale
| North Yorkshire County Council
|-
!YO19
| YORK
| Dunnington, Escrick, Wheldrake, Murton, Riccall, Stillingfleet, Warthill
|City of York Council, North Yorkshire County Council 
|-
!YO21
| WHITBY
| Whitby, Westerdale
| North Yorkshire County Council
|-
!YO22
| WHITBY
| Robin Hood's Bay
| North Yorkshire County Council
|-
!YO23
| YORK
| South Bank, Bishopthorpe, Copmanthorpe, Rufforth
| City of York Council, North Yorkshire County Council
|-
!YO24
| YORK
| Acomb,  Dringhouses, Woodthorpe
| City of York Council
|-
!YO25
| DRIFFIELD
| Driffield
| East Riding of Yorkshire
|-
!YO26
| YORK
| Acomb, Leeman Road Area, Upper Poppleton, Nether Poppleton, Green Hammerton
| City of York Council, North Yorkshire County Council
|-
!YO30
| YORK
| Bootham, Clifton, Skelton, Linton-on-Ouse
| City of York Council, North Yorkshire County Council
|-
!YO31
| YORK
| Heworth, Huntington (South), The Groves, Layerthorpe
| City of York Council
|-
!YO32
| YORK
| Haxby, Huntington (North), Wigginton, New Earswick, Stockton-on-the-Forest, Strensall
| City of York Council
|-
!YO41
| YORK
| Elvington, Full Sutton, Stamford Bridge, Sutton upon Derwent, Wilberfoss
| 
|-
!YO42
| YORK
|Pocklington, Barmby Moor, Melbourne, Seaton Ross
| East Riding of Yorkshire
|-
!YO43
| YORK
| Market Weighton, Holme-on-Spalding-Moor
| East Riding of Yorkshire
|-
!YO51
| YORK
| Boroughbridge
| North Yorkshire County Council
|-
!YO60
| YORK
| Sheriff Hutton
| 
|-
!YO61
| YORK
| Easingwold
| North Yorkshire County Council
|-
!YO62
| YORK
| Helmsley, Kirkbymoorside, Nawton
| North Yorkshire County Council
|-
!YO90
| YORK
| Large offices in Rougier Street and Wellington Row in York
| 
|}

Map

See also
Postcode Address File
List of postcode areas in the United Kingdom

References

External links
Royal Mail's Postcode Address File
A quick introduction to Royal Mail's Postcode Address File (PAF)

Geography of York
Postcode areas covering Yorkshire and the Humber